Ashleigh Harrington (born ) is a Canadian actress. She is the star of The Girls on Film and can also be seen in the second season of the BBC America series, Copper, the Netflix TV series Hemlock Grove, Black Friday and Let the Game Begin. She is also a creator and producer of The Girls on Film with the actor Jeff Hammond. In 2011, she won the award for Best Acting in a Trek Viral Video from TrekMovie.com for her portrayal of James T. Kirk in The Girls on Film, as well as Bleedfest Film Festival's Producers Award in May 2011 for The Girls on Film series.

Filmography

References

External links 
 

Canadian film actresses
Canadian television actresses
Living people
1980s births